Georges Bank (formerly known as St. Georges Bank) is a large elevated area of the sea floor between Cape Cod, Massachusetts (United States), and Cape Sable Island, Nova Scotia (Canada). It separates the Gulf of Maine from the Atlantic Ocean.

The origin of its name is obscure. The 1610 Velasco map, prepared for King James I of England, used the name "S. Georges Banck", a common practice when the name of the English patron saint, St. George, was sprinkled around the English-colonized world. By the 1850s, it was known simply as Georges Bank.

Physical environment
Georges Bank is the most westward of the great Atlantic fishing banks. The now-submerged portions of the North American mainland are comprised in the continental shelf running from the Grand Banks of Newfoundland to Georges. Georges Bank was part of the North American mainland as recently as 12,000 years ago.

Its depth ranges from several metres to several dozen metres; the entire bank is at least  shallower than the Gulf of Maine to the north.

Gulf of Maine shelf waters are the Bank's primary source. They enter the northern flank, move clockwise around the eastern end, and then westward along the southern flank, mostly emptying into the Mid-Atlantic Bight (the continental shelf ocean between Cape Hatteras and Georges Bank).

Commercial fishing
Georges Bank, while not having the most productive fishery in the world (the Grand Banks takes this claim), has great prominence in that it is probably the most geographically accessible of all the fishing banks in the North Atlantic. Lying adjacent to New England's famous seaports, Georges Bank is singlehandedly responsible for the development of coastal fisheries in towns such as Gloucester, Massachusetts, and Yarmouth, Nova Scotia.

For over 400 years, Georges Bank supported lucrative fisheries for Atlantic cod and halibut. Over time, bottom trawlers became very efficient, some catching as much cod in an hour as traditional boats caught in a season. Bottom trawlers, however, damaged the sea floor coral and sponge habitats, and federal fisheries regulations aim to control this large scale overfishing to establish future sustainability.

From 1976 to 1982, oil companies drilled ten exploratory wells in the U.S. part of the Georges Bank.  None were successful, however, and both Canada and the United States have since imposed moratoriums on oil exploration and production on the Georges Bank, to ensure fisheries conservation.

The decision by Canada and the United States to extend fisheries jurisdiction out to 200 miles in 1977 led to overlapping claims on Georges Bank, and resulted in quickly deteriorating relations between fishers from both countries. Both nations agreed in 1979 to refer the question of maritime boundary delimitation to the International Court of Justice in The Hague. The ICJ delivered its decision in 1984 dividing Georges Bank fisheries between the two countries in a way that disappointed American fishermen. 
On September 15, 2016, President of the United States Barack Obama proclaimed the Northeast Canyons and Seamounts Marine National Monument to protect the area's marine biodiversity. This protected a portion of Georges Bank from fishing and mining. Despite the protection, commercial fishing for deep sea red crab and American lobster is allowed to continue within the monument for a grace period of seven years.

See also 
 Texas Tower 3
 Lobster Wars (TV documentary)

Notes

References
Backus, R. H. and Bourne, D. W. (Eds.). George's Bank. MIT Press, 1987. 
Mark B. Feldman Oral History at p. 87, Foreign Affairs Oral History Collection, Association for Diplomatic Studies and Training, https://adst.org/OH%20TOCs/Feldman.Mark.pdf

Feldman and Colson, The Maritime Boundaries of the United States, 74 AJIL 729 [October 1981].

External links 
 U.S. Considers Seismic Testing in Georges Bank, First Time Since 30 Years of 28 January 2010
 House Passes comprehensive energy bill, protecting Georges Bank from oil and gas exploration .
 Lobster War: The Fight Over the World's Richest Fishing Grounds (movie documentary)

Disputed waters
Fishing areas of the Atlantic Ocean
Landforms of the Atlantic Ocean
Undersea banks of the Atlantic Ocean